Five Corners may refer to:

Places

Canada
 An area of the Boyle Street neighborhood of Edmonton, Alberta
 An intersection in Cloverdale, Surrey, British Columbia
 Five Corners, New Brunswick, a community
 Five Corners, Ontario, a township
 An intersection on Broadway Avenue in Saskatoon, Saskatchewan, Canada

Finland
 An intersection in the Punavuori neighbourhood of Helsinki

Russia
 Five Corners, Murmansk, the main square of Murmansk
 An intersection near the Russian Monument in Sofia
 A crossroad on Rubinstein Street in St. Petersburg

United States
 An intersection in the Irvington District of Fremont, California
 An intersection on Newspaper Row in San Francisco, California
 Five Corners, Indiana, a ghost town
 An area of Blackstone, Massachusetts
 An area of Holt, Michigan
 Five Corners, Jersey City, New Jersey, a neighborhood
 Five Corners, Michigan, an unincorporated community
 Five Corners, Newark, New Jersey, a landmark
 Five Corners, Perth Amboy, New Jersey, a neighborhood
 Five Corners, Ohio, a community
 Five Corners, Oregon, a community
 Five Corners, Washington, a census-designated place
 Five Corners, Wisconsin (disambiguation), multiple places in Wisconsin
 Five Corners District, a management district in Houston, Texas
 Five Corners Historic District, South Williamstown, Massachusetts

New York
 Five Corners, New Windsor, New York
 Five Corners, Rotterdam, an intersection in New York
 Hamlets in:
 Amboy, New York
 Ballston, New York
 Genoa, New York
 Jasper, New York
 Lenox, New York
 Lynbrook, New York
 New Berlin, New York
 Onondaga, New York
 Sangerfield, New York
 Vails Gate, New York
 Vestal, New York

Other uses
 Five Corners (film)
 "Five Corners", a song by The Doobie Brothers from the 2004 album Live at Wolf Trap
Five Corners, a fictional location in The Simpsons television series, modeled after the Four Corners Monument

See also
 Four Corners (disambiguation)
 Five Points (disambiguation)
 UFV Five Corners, a satellite campus of University of the Fraser Valley, British Columbia, Canada